Gramada Glacier is a  long glacier on Smith Island in the South Shetland Islands, Antarctica draining the southeast slopes of Imeon Range east of Riggs Peak, southeast of Madan Saddle and south of Neofit Peak.  It is situated southwest of Armira Glacier and northeast of Letnitsa Glacier, and flows southeastward into Brashlyan Cove on Osmar Strait. The glacier is named after the town of Gramada in northwestern Bulgaria.

Location
Bulgarian early mapping in 2009.

See also
 List of glaciers in the Antarctic
 Glaciology

Maps
Chart of South Shetland including Coronation Island, &c. from the exploration of the sloop Dove in the years 1821 and 1822 by George Powell Commander of the same. Scale ca. 1:200000. London: Laurie, 1822.
  L.L. Ivanov. Antarctica: Livingston Island and Greenwich, Robert, Snow and Smith Islands. Scale 1:120000 topographic map. Troyan: Manfred Wörner Foundation, 2010.  (First edition 2009. )
 South Shetland Islands: Smith and Low Islands. Scale 1:150000 topographic map No. 13677. British Antarctic Survey, 2009.
 Antarctic Digital Database (ADD). Scale 1:250000 topographic map of Antarctica. Scientific Committee on Antarctic Research (SCAR). Since 1993, regularly upgraded and updated.
 L.L. Ivanov. Antarctica: Livingston Island and Smith Island. Scale 1:100000 topographic map. Manfred Wörner Foundation, 2017.

Notes

External links
 Gramada Glacier SCAR Composite Antarctic Gazetteer
 Bulgarian Antarctic Gazetteer. Antarctic Place-names Commission. (details in Bulgarian, basic data in English)
 Gramada Glacier. Copernix satellite image

Glaciers of Smith Island (South Shetland Islands)
Bulgaria and the Antarctic